Kohabara   is a village development committee in Jhapa District in the Province No. 1 of south-eastern Nepal. RamChandre Khola,a stream, separates it from Khajurgachhi VDC.

Population
Major ethnicities includes Brahmin and Chhetri and Nepali is a major language spoken by the people here. At the time of the 2011 Nepal census it had a population of 10,326 people.
Baniyatol is one of the village in this VDC which is quite developed in comparison to other villages here.

References

Populated places in Jhapa District